Mount Maropea is a prominent peak in southern Hawke's Bay, in New Zealand's eastern North Island, rising to 1481 metres. It lies in the Ruahine Range, within the boundaries of the Ruahine Forest Park. The slightly larger Te Atua Mahuru lies just to the north.

Central Hawke's Bay District
Mountains of the Hawke's Bay Region